Magnus Minniskiöld (also spelled Minnisköld or Minnesköld, circa 1175—1208?) was a medieval Swedish magnate from the House of Bjelbo. For posterity, he is best known as the father of the renowned statesman Birger Jarl, and the ancestor of the later Swedish kings. He is sometimes believed to have perished in the Battle of Lena in 1208, though the evidence is not conclusive.

Family
His earliest known ancestor is thought to be Folke the Fat, a powerful Swedish leader of the early 12th century, who married Ingegerd Knudsdatter, daughter of Canute the Saint of Denmark and Adela of Flanders, a descendant of Charlemagne. Ingegerd and her sister Cecilia both went to Sweden after the death of Adela and married there, and Folke and his kin were therefore close to the ruling elite of the Kingdom of Denmark.

A medieval Swedish genealogy states that "Folke the Fat was the father of Benedictus (Bengt) Snivil, and that Benedictus sired Jarl Birger, Jarl Charles, and Magnus who was called Minniskiöld". While his older brother Birger Brosa held the office of Riksjarl between 1174 and 1202, the younger Magnus lived at the family estate Bjälbo, in the current Mjölby municipality, Östergötland, Sweden.<ref>Ingrid Gustin "Kvinnan, tornet och makten i Bjälbo" i Mats Mogren, Mats Roslund, Barbro Sundnér och Jes Wienberg (redaktörer) Triangulering. Historisk arkeologi vidgar fälten", Lund Studies in Historical Archaeology 11, Institutionen för arkeologi och antikens historia, Lunds universitet, Lund 2009, ISSN 1653-1183, sid. 112-114</ref> It has been assumed that he was the Lawspeaker of Östergötland, though this is not documented. He married the noblewoman Ingrid Ylva, of possible royal descent, and fathered several sons who would influence early Swedish history, most notably Birger Jarl. He is mentioned in two contemporary diplomas (DS 70, 116), as the brother of Birger Brosa, as well as by King Magnus Birgersson, who in a letter in 1280 called him "grandfather".

The cognomen of Magnus, Latinized as Mijneskiold, has been explained in various ways. It could derive from minni (memory), it may allude to his having a moon (måne) on his shield, or it could be interpreted as "smaller shield" (mindre sköld).

Magnus Minnesköld was probably married twice; this has been inferred from the great differences in the ages of his children.  Nothing is known about his supposed first wife. Magnus married his second wife around 1195. This was Ingrid Ylva who, according to the Swedish reformer and historian Olaus Petri, was a daughter of Sune Sik. The same information is found in a medieval genealogy copied in the 16th century. Sune Sik, if he existed, was a younger son of King Sverker I of Sweden.

Children
From first marriage:
Eskil Magnusson, Lawspeaker of Västergötland between 1217 and 1225. He was married to Kristina, the granddaughter of Eric the Saint and the widow of the Norwegian earl Hakon the Mad.
Maybe a daughter, who married Sigtrygg Bengtsson (Boberg).

With either of his wives
Karl Magnusson,  Bishop of Linköping who died at the Battle of Lihula in Estonia in 1220.
Bengt Magnusson († 4 January 1237), succeeded Karl Magnusson as Bishop of Linköping and died in 1237.

From second marriage:
Birger Magnusson, Birger Jarl who played a pivotal role in the consolidation of Sweden while Jarl in Sweden.  
His son Valdemar Birgersson became King of Sweden in 1250 as the successor to his maternal uncle, Eric XI of Sweden, called "the lisping and the lame" (king 1222-1250); he was the first of the House of Bjälbo - better known as the Folkungs - and was the King of Sweden in 1250 - 1275.
Elavus (Elof) Magnusson died in 1268, perhaps son of Ingrid Ylva from a later marriage.
Given the many sons, he may also have had daughters whose names are not known.

Struggle for the crown
Judging from the properties of his descendants, Magnus Minniskiöld owned various lands in Östergötland, and is probably responsible for the construction of the church of Bjälbo. Although, as the younger brother of Birger Brosa, Magnus was not the head of the powerful family, his central position in the ruling elite suggests that he was actively involved in the fight between Sverker II of Sweden of the House of Sverker, and Erik Knutsson of the House of Eric, for the Swedish crown, which was contested over three main battles.
The first was the Battle of Älgarås, (now a place in the Swedish community Töreboda in Västergötland) in November 1205, where King Sverker II defeated Erik Knutsson. The second one was the battle Battle of Lena (now Kungslena in Västergötland) on 31 January 1208, in which Erik Knutsson, with a Swedish (and Norwegian?) army, won a devastating victory over King Sverker II and his Danish army, drove him from the throne and placed himself in the throne as Erik X, King of Sweden from 1208 to 1216. The last was the Battle of Gestilren (perhaps in Enköping in Uppland) on July 17, 1210, in which the displaced King Sverker II, with a Danish army, attempted to regain his throne, but was defeated and died in the battle.

A medieval Liber Daticus (Book of Donations) from Lund states that an aristocrat called Magnus fell at the Battle of Lena ("II Kal. Februar. obiit Magnus, qui occisus est in Gocia apud Lene, Anno Dominice incarnationis MCCVIII"). The equation of this Magnus with Magnus Minniskiöld is not certain, however. The remains of his son Birger Jarl have been examined, and they indicate that he was 50–55 years old when he died, and Magnus was therefore probably still alive some years after the Lena battle.

References

Further reading
Harrison, Dick (2002) Jarlens sekel: en berättelse om 1200-talets Sverige. Stockholm: Ordfront.
Koht, Halfdan  (1929) The Scandinavian Kingdoms until the end of the thirteenth century''  (Cambridge University Press)

Swedish nobility
Swedish politicians
Year of birth uncertain
Year of death uncertain
13th-century deaths
13th-century Swedish people
House of Bjelbo